is a town in Ibaraki Prefecture, Japan. , the town had an estimated population of 15,073 in 6163 households and a population density of 605 persons per km². The percentage of the population aged over 65 was 46.6%.

Geography
Tone is located in the flatlands in the very southern portion of Ibaraki Prefecture, bordered by Chiba Prefecture to the south. The Tone River, along with the Shin-Tone River and Kogawa River pass through the town.

Neighboring municipalities
Ibaraki Prefecture
Ryūgasaki
Toride
Kawachi
Chiba Prefecture
Abiko
Inzai
Sakae

Climate
Tone has a Humid continental climate (Köppen Cfa) characterized by warm summers and cool winters with light snowfall.  The average annual temperature in Kitaibaraki is 14.5 °C. The average annual rainfall is 1345 mm with September as the wettest month. The temperatures are highest on average in August, at around 26.2 °C, and lowest in January, at around 3.8 °C.

Demographics
Per Japanese census data, the population of Tone peaked around 1990 and has steadily declined since.

History
The area of present-day Tone was part of Kitasōma District in Shimōsa Province, as the boundary between Shimōsa and Hitachi Province had been established I the Nara period as the Tone River. However, by the Meiji period, the course of the river had shifted, leaving the area of present-day Tone on the northern bank of the river. This area was transferred to Ibaraki Prefecture in 1875. It was organized into the town of Fukawa and the villages of Fumi, and Momma within Kitasōma District, Ibaraki Prefecture with the establishment of the modern municipalities system on April 1, 1889.

The modern town of Tone was founded by the merger of Fukawa with Fumi and Momma on January 1, 1955.

Government
Tone has a mayor-council form of government with a directly elected mayor and a unicameral town council of 12 members. Tone, together with neighboring Ryūgasaki, contributes two members to the Ibaraki Prefectural Assembly. In terms of national politics, the city is part of Ibaraki 3rd district of the lower house of the Diet of Japan.

Economy
Tone was a small agricultural community until the creation of new towns which transformed the area into a commuter town for Tokyo metropolis. However, due to poor transportation connections and an aging population, the population of the town is now in decline and property prices have suffered severe declines. Discussions for a merger with neighboring Ryūgasaki were suspended in 2005, partly due to the town's high debt burden and increasingly poor revenue base.

Education
Japan Wellness Sports University
 Tone has three public elementary schools and one public middle school operated by town city government. The town does not have a high school.

Transportation

Railway
Tone does not have any passenger railway line.

Highway
The town is not served by any national highway. Primary access is by Chiba Prefectural Route 4 and 170, and by Ibaraki Prefectural Route 11, 68 and 209.

Local attractions
 Yanagida Kunio Memorial Museum

Noted people from Tone
Jun Sadogawa, manga artist

References

External links

Official Website 

Towns in Ibaraki Prefecture
Tone, Ibaraki